Paiute cutthroat trout (Oncorhynchus clarkii seleniris) is one of fourteen subspecies of cutthroat trout. Paiute Cutthroat are native only to Silver King Creek, a headwater tributary of the Carson River in the Sierra Nevada, in California. This subspecies is named after the indigenous Northern Paiute peoples.

Paiute cutthroat trout are endemic to and protected within the Carson Ranger District of the Humboldt-Toiyabe National Forest. The Carson River lies within the Great Basin interior drainage system, within the historic range of Lahontan cutthroat trout (Oncorhynchus clarki henshawi).

Natural history
It is believed that a sub-population of Lahontan cutthroats became isolated in Silver King Creek above Silver King Canyon Gorge after erosion made the gorge impassable to trout swimming upstream, probably between 5,000 and 8,000 years ago. The upstream population then adapted to local conditions independent of the larger population below that had evolved in pluvial Lake Lahontan during the Pleistocene. Although Lahontan cutthroats are heavily spotted, the isolated sub-population lost virtually all spotting, perhaps because spots made fish more visible and susceptible to predation in the ultra-clear and shallow mountain stream. Paiute cutthroats are also notable for a purple coloration, whereas Lahontan cutthroats have bronze coloration. The Paiute strain must have adapted to a diet mainly of insects and become less migratory since juvenile fish swimming downstream in search of larger waters would have passed below downstream barriers and left the isolated gene pool.

Conservation
Basque sheepherders began grazing sheep along upper Silver King Creek in the 1800s. They noticed the unusual trout and by 1912 had transplanted them above Llewellyn Falls which had originally been the upper limit. This is fortunate because by 1924 hybrids with ordinary Lahontan cutthroat and introduced rainbow trout (cutbows) were found below Llewellyn Falls, either due to ill-considered stocking or barriers in the gorge washing out.

Since the finite and localized population of Paiute cutthroats was vulnerable to forest fire and angling as well as hybridization, relatively unhybridized Paiute cutthroats from upstream were transplanted into virtually all available tributaries of Silver King Creek above the gorge, into Stairway and Sharktooth Creeks to the south in the Sierra Nevada, and into Cottonwood Creek and Cabin Creek in the White Mountains.

The subspecies was listed as an endangered species in 1967. In 1975 it was upgraded to threatened status.

Subsequent studies have found some degree of hybridization in virtually all populations of Paiute cutthroats. This was initially addressed by poisoning stream segments with higher levels of hybridization and transplanting fish from other stream segments thought to be less hybridized. In the 1980s the focus shifted somewhat to electrofishing, which temporarily stuns fish so they can be captured and examined. Fish showing more evidence of hybridization are removed to other drainages, while relatively pure Paiute cutthroats are returned to the water unharmed.

Angling is prohibited in most streams where Paiute cutthroats predominate, however future plans include downstream expansion of Paiute cutthroat range by removing other trout and installing barriers.

Although restoration plans were delayed by lawsuits concerned about the impact of rotenone on other stream inhabitants,  the U.S. Fish & Wildlife Service decided in May, 2010 to proceed with poisoning to eradicate non-native and hybrid trout in Silver King Creek from Llewellyn Falls downstream to the confluence with Snodgrass Creek and associated tributaries; and to restore Paiute cutthroat trout to its historical range through stocking. When populations are sufficient, the subspecies may be de-listed and limited angling may be permitted.

Notes

Further reading
 

Paiute cutthroat trout
Cold water fish
Trout, Paiute cutthroat
Fish of the Western United States
Fauna of the Great Basin
Trout, Paiute cutthroat
Freshwater fish of the United States
Paiute cutthroat trout
Paiute cutthroat trout
Paiute cutthroat trout
Fauna without expected TNC conservation status